Mono No Aware is a cinema-arts non-profit organization. Founded in 2007, its mission entails the advancement of “connectivity through the cinematic experience.” The organization is named after the Japanese concept mono no aware (物の哀れ), which expresses the impermanence  of being and beauty.

Mono No Aware is based in Brooklyn, New York and organizes artist screenings,  analog filmmaking workshops, equipment rentals, and film stock distribution. Film artists Bill Brand and Leslie Thornton serve on its Advisory Board. Since its founding, the organization has hosted an annual film festival, exhibiting expanded cinema works from around the world that utilize both analog technologies and live performance. Following the completion of the tenth festival, a month-long series of exhibitions, Mono No Aware undertook the construction of the first non-profit motion picture laboratory to operate in the United States.

Annual film festival 
In 2007, the first Mono No Aware film festival was held in the Galapagos Art Space in Brooklyn. It was free to attend and free to submit and the same holds true today. In 2016, the organization, in celebration of its tenth anniversary, organized MONO X, a 21-event film festival spanning three boroughs in New York City. It presented the work of 150 artists to an audience of 5,000. Works included sculpture, expanded cinema, and installation art incorporating the moving image on film and/or video. Presenting sponsors included Kodak, Brooklyn Brewery, and Technicolor.

Educational Initiatives 
Mono No Aware runs workshops in Brooklyn year-round, and collaborates with institutions throughout North America, to teach students analog filmmaking techniques. Workshops include non-toxic film processing with coffee and beer, hand-making photographic emulsion, 2D and 3D analog animation,  optical printing and contact printing, and Super 8mm, 16mm, and 35mm filmmaking.

See also 

 Mono no aware

References

External links 
 

Film organizations in the United States
Experimental film festivals
Non-profit organizations based in the United States
Arts organizations based in New York City